A single-field dictionary is a specialized dictionary that has been designed and compiled to cover the terms of one particular subject field. Single-field dictionaries should be contrasted with multi-field dictionaries and sub-field dictionaries.

The typology consisting of these three dictionaries is important for a number of reasons. First of all a single-field dictionary is an example of a very specialized dictionary in that it covers only one single subject field. Examples of single-field dictionaries are a dictionary of law, a dictionary of economics and a dictionary of welding.

The main advantage of single-field dictionaries is that they can easily be maximizing dictionaries, i.e. attempt to cover as many terms of the subject field as possible without being a dictionary in several volumes. Consequently, single-fields dictionaries are ideal for extensive coverage of the linguistic and extra-linguistic aspects within a particular subject field.

Secondly, if the lexicographers intend to make a bilingual, maximizing single-field dictionary they will not run into the same problems with the space available for presenting the large amount of data that has to be included in the dictionary, cf. a multi-field dictionary.

Consequently, the best coverage of linguistic and extra-linguistic aspects within the subject field covered by a dictionary will be found in a single-field dictionary. However, even more extensive coverage is possible in a sub-field dictionary.

Further reading
Sandro Nielsen: "Contrastive Description of Dictionaries Covering LSP Communication". In: Fachsprache/International Journal of LSP 3-4/1990, 129–136.

Dictionaries by type